Douglas Borges (born 30 March 1990) is a Brazilian footballer who plays as a goalkeeper for Botafogo.

Club career
Born in Franca, São Paulo, Douglas Borges began his career with Sãocarlense before joining Cruzeiro's youth setup at the age of 15. After finishing his formation, he went on a series of loans to Itaúna, Guarani-MG, Monte Azul, Tupi and Volta Redonda.

Douglas Borges signed a permanent deal with Tupi on 27 November 2013, but moved to Olímpia the following 8 June. He then returned to Volta Redonda, where he became a starter.

On 18 August 2015, Douglas Borges moved to Ceará until the end of the year. He signed for Remo in the following January, and returned to his parent club in October 2016.

On 3 December 2020, Douglas Borges moved to CRB on loan for the remainder of the 2020 Série B. He terminated his contract with Voltaço on 10 February 2021, and was announced at Novorizontino on the same day. Fourteen days later, however, he left the latter club after receiving an "irrefutable offer", and signed for Botafogo on 4 March.

Career statistics

Honours
Tupi
 Campeonato Brasileiro Série D: 2011

Botafogo
 Campeonato Brasileiro Série B: 2021

References

External links
 Botafogo profile 

1990 births
Living people
People from Franca
Brazilian footballers
Association football goalkeepers
Campeonato Brasileiro Série B players
Campeonato Brasileiro Série C players
Campeonato Brasileiro Série D players
Cruzeiro Esporte Clube players
Esporte Clube Itaúna players
Guarani Esporte Clube (MG) players
Atlético Monte Azul players
Tupi Football Club players
Volta Redonda FC players
Olímpia Futebol Clube players
Ceará Sporting Club players
Clube do Remo players
Clube de Regatas Brasil players
Botafogo de Futebol e Regatas players
Footballers from São Paulo (state)